Alberto Ezequiel Melián (born 2 January 1990) is an Argentinian boxer.

Amateur career 
Melián reached the final of the 2010 South American Games at light flyweight, but lost to Oscar Negrete. At the 2012 Summer Olympics he was defeated in the preliminary round of the men's bantamweight tournament by Sergey Vodopyanov, 5-12. At the 2016 Summer Olympics he once again participated in the men's bantamweight tournament, winning his first two bouts but losing to Murodjon Akhmadaliev by technical knockout in the quarter-finals.  Among Melian's outstanding amateur victories were wins over Cuban Olympic champion Robeisy Ramirez and Frenchman Khedafi Djelkhir, Olympic silver medalist in Beijing 2008 and APB Series World champion. In 2014, he was awarded the "Firpo de Oro" as the best boxer in the country, amateur or professional, by the Boxing´s Journalist Union of Argentina (UPERBOX). He expects to compete for a world title before his tenth professional fight.

Professional career
Melián made his professional debut in December 2017 against former world title challenger Diego Santillan. Considered by several experts as the best Argentine amateur boxer of the last decade, Melian represented Argentina in numerous international tournaments, including double Olympic participation at the Olympic Games in London 2012 and Rio de Janeiro in 2016. After knocking out the former world title contender Diego Ricardo Santillan in the fifth round in his debut (who entered the ring at 23-2), Melian received the challenge of Aristule, who was present at ringside. Melian accepted the challenge, but asked Aristule to put his national title on the line.

Professional boxing record

References

External links
 
 
 
 
 

1990 births
Living people
Argentine male boxers
Bantamweight boxers
Olympic boxers of Argentina
Boxers at the 2012 Summer Olympics
Boxers at the 2016 Summer Olympics
Pan American Games competitors for Argentina
Boxers at the 2011 Pan American Games
South American Games silver medalists for Argentina
South American Games medalists in boxing
Competitors at the 2010 South American Games
Sportspeople from Córdoba Province, Argentina